The 1990–91 Bulgarian Cup was the 51st season of the Bulgarian Cup. Levski Sofia won the competition, beating Botev Plovdiv 2–1 in the final at the Ivaylo Stadium in Veliko Tarnovo.

First round
In this round entered winners from the preliminary rounds together with the teams from B Group.

|-
!colspan=5 style="background-color:#D0F0C0;" |28 November / 5 December 1990

Second round
This round featured winners from the First Round and all 16 teams from A Group.

|-
!colspan=5 style="background-color:#D0F0C0;" |9 / 16 December 1990

Group stage

Group 1
Matches were played in Petrich and Sandanski

|-
!colspan=3 style="background-color:#D0F0C0;" |10 February 1991

|-
!colspan=3 style="background-color:#D0F0C0;" |13 February 1991

|-
!colspan=3 style="background-color:#D0F0C0;" |16 February 1991

|}

Group 2
Matches were played in Nesebar, Balgarovo, Dolno Ezerovo and Pomorie

|-
!colspan=3 style="background-color:#D0F0C0;" |10 February 1991

|-
!colspan=3 style="background-color:#D0F0C0;" |13 February 1991

|-
!colspan=3 style="background-color:#D0F0C0;" |16 February 1991

|}

Group 3
Matches were played in Banya and Kazanlak

|-
!colspan=3 style="background-color:#D0F0C0;" |10 February 1991

|-
!colspan=3 style="background-color:#D0F0C0;" |13 February 1991

|-
!colspan=3 style="background-color:#D0F0C0;" |16 February 1991

|}

Group 4
Matches were played in Sliven and Yambol

|-
!colspan=3 style="background-color:#D0F0C0;" |10 February 1991

|-
!colspan=3 style="background-color:#D0F0C0;" |13 February 1991

|-
!colspan=3 style="background-color:#D0F0C0;" |16 February 1991

|}

Semi-finals

|-
!colspan=5 style="background-color:#D0F0C0;" |3 April / 8 May 1991

Final

Details

References

1990-91
1990–91 domestic association football cups
Cup